Will Bruder (born 1946) is an American architect.

Biography 
Self-trained as an architect, Will Bruder received a Bachelor of Fine Arts in sculpture from the University of Wisconsin–Milwaukee, taking supplemental courses in structural engineering, philosophy, art history, and urban planning.  Bruder was a student of Paolo Soleri, where he acquired field experience in woodwork, metal work, and masonry.  In the summer of 1967, Bruder participated in Soleri's Silt Pile Workshop, and in 1968, he was an apprentice of Soleri at his Cosanti studio. Projects that he worked on during that time with Soleri include construction of the concrete vaults of the main drafting room, the 3D Jersey Project, and Soleri's book Arcology: The City in the Image of Man. After graduating from college in 1969, Bruder spent a year as an apprentice of Gunnar Birkerts, where he aided in the design of the Contemporary Arts Museum Houston. In 1973, he obtained registration as an architect and opened his first studio in 1974. In 1987, he was a fellow at the American Academy in Rome.

In 2019 Will Bruder moved his practice from Phoenix, Arizona to Portland, Oregon.

Selected works

Burton Barr Central Library 
The Burton Barr Central Library in Phoenix, Arizona, is a five-story, 280,000-square-foot (26,000 m²) building that houses an open, one-acre (4,000 m²) reading room and a single, central open core providing vertical circulation. This central core, the "crystal canyon", is an atrium containing three high-speed elevators and a grand staircase. The building incorporates a roof inspired by Buckminster Fuller's tensegrity structures with motorized louvers on its south face for sun control. The reading room on the fifth floor has skylights that allow sunlight to shine directly onto the top of each corresponding column on solar noon of the summer solstice. In 2008, the library was chosen as one of the Phoenix Points of Pride, and in 2010, it received a LEED Existing Buildings Silver 2.0 designation. On May 7, 2021 the Burton Barr Central Library received the AIA 25 Year Award.

Temple Kol Ami 
Completed in 1994, the Temple features stone masonry inspired by ancient communities in Israel.

Riddell Advertising Agency 
The building takes inspiration from its natural surroundings in Jackson, Wyoming. A skylit atrium with three log columns centers the vertically organized building. The building includes office space, a presentation room, photography studio, library, and lunchroom.

Nevada Museum of Art 
The exterior resembles Nevada's geography in the Black Rock Desert. The interior features an atrium that extends over four stories and a glass pavilion. The Reno museum was completed in 2003.

Loloma 5 
Five 1,540-square-foot mixed-use living/work structures are accented on the exterior with a perforated metal gate and bamboo/mesh fence. The building has a sustainable, desert design. In 2005, the multi-unit development received a Citation Award from AIA Western Mountain Region and a Merit Award from AIA Arizona.

Scottsdale Museum of Contemporary Art 
Completed in Scottsdale, Arizona, in 1999, the museum is a retrofit of a former movie theater. It is minimalist in design with four galleries. The building has a James Turrell Skyspace Knight Rise. The exterior features the Scrim Wall by James Carpenter Design Associates.

Henkel North American Headquarters 
Located on about five acres in Scottsdale, the Henkel Headquarters is a 348,000-square-foot, four-story structure. The “Cafetorium” serves as a meeting point for employees. The building also features a rooftop building. The building was awarded a LEED Silver rating because of its use of thermal and shading technologies, raised floor systems, and indirect lighting in office areas.

Agave Library 
Completed in 2009, the 25,405-square-foot branch library is constructed of stacked bond concrete masonry units and glass enclosing a rectangular space with hard-trowelled concrete floors and sandblasted cmu walls. Situated in a suburban shopping center, the construction recalls the tradition of drive-in movie theaters common in post-war American suburbs. The library received the Landmark Library Award in 2011 and an Honor Award from AIA Arizona in 2010.

Other works

Public 
  Phoenix Public Library Branches: Mesquite (1979), Cholla (1986), Agave (2009)
Deer Valley Rock Art Center, Deer Valley, Arizona, 1994
  Hercules Public Library, Hercules, California, 2006
  Billings Public Library, Billings, Montana, 2015
  E.L. Cord Museum School, Reno, Nevada, 2014
  Billings Public Library, Billings, Montana, 2010–2013
  Bridget Hall, Mesa, Arizona, 2010
  Hercules Library, Hercules, California, 2006
  Teton County Library, Jackson, Wyoming, 1997

Commercial 
 Mad River Boat Trips, Jackson, Wyoming, 1997
 Ingo Tasty Food, Phoenix, Arizona, 2013

Residential 
 Hill-Sheppard Residence, Phoenix, Arizona, 1993
 Byrne Residence, Scottsdale, Arizona, 1998
 Sky Arc House, Marin County, California, 1999
 Pond House, Cave Creek, Arizona, 2002
 Riddell Residence, Wilson, Wyoming, 2002
 Bass Residence, Tucson, Arizona, 1994

Awards 
 2013 FAIA in Design: Election to The College of Fellows, American Institute of Architects
 2011 Residential Architect Leadership Award, Hall of Fame
 2011 Landmark Library, Library Journal: Agave Library, Phoenix, Arizona
 2010 Honor Award, AIA Arizona: Agave Library, Phoenix, Arizona
 2010 Honor Award, AIA Arizona/Desert Living House of the Year: Jarson Residence, Paradise Valley, Arizona
 2009 Residential Interior Award, IIDA Arizona Chapter: Feigin Residence, Reno, Nevada
 2008 Architect of the Year, AIA Arizona
 2000 Academy Award, American Academy of Arts and Letters
 2000 Visionary Award of Excellence, AZ IFDA Awards and Honors
 2000 Chrysler Design Award
 1997 Award of Excellence, AIA/American Library Association: Phoenix Central Library, Phoenix, Arizona
 1996 Educator of the Year Award, AIA Arizona
 1987 Rome Prize, American Academy in Rome

References

External links
 Will Bruder Architects website

20th-century American architects
21st-century American architects
Architects from Milwaukee
Living people
1946 births
University of Wisconsin–Milwaukee alumni
Architects from Arizona
Architecture firms based in Arizona